The Four Heavenly Kings are four Buddhist gods, each of whom is believed to watch over one cardinal direction of the world. In Chinese mythology, they are known collectively as the "Fēng Tiáo Yǔ Shùn" or "Sìdà Tiānwáng". In the ancient language Sanskrit, they are called the "Chaturmahārāja" (चतुर्महाराज) or "Chaturmahārājikādeva": "Four Great Heavenly Kings". The Hall of Four Heavenly Kings is a standard component of Chinese Buddhist temples.

Names
The Kings are collectively named as follows:

The Four Heavenly Kings are said to currently live in the Cāturmahārājika heaven (Pali: Cātummahārājika, "Of the Four Great Kings") on the lower slopes of Mount Sumeru, which is the lowest of the six worlds of the devas of the Kāmadhātu. They are the protectors of the world and fighters of evil, each able to command a legion of supernatural creatures to protect the Dharma.

Mythology
On the 8th, 14th and 15th days of each lunar month, the Kings either send out emissaries or go themselves to inspect the state of virtue and morality in the world of men. Then they report their findings to the assembly of the  devas.

On the orders of Śakra, the Kings and their retinues stand guard to protect  from another attack by the Asuras, which once threatened to destroy the realm of the devas. They also vowed to protect the Buddha, the Dharma, and the Buddha's followers from danger. In Chinese Buddhism, all four of the heavenly kings are regarded as four of the Twenty Devas (二十諸天 Èrshí Zhūtiān) or the Twenty-Four Devas (二十四諸天 Èrshísì zhūtiān), a group of Buddhist dharmapalas who manifest to protect the Dharma.

According to Vasubandhu, devas born in the Cāturmahārājika heaven are 1/4 of a krośa in height (about 750 feet tall). They have a five-hundred-year lifespan, of which each day is equivalent to 50 years in our world; thus their total lifespan amounts to about nine million years (other sources say 90,000 years).

The umbrella was a symbol of regal sovereignty in ancient India, and the sword is a symbol of martial prowess. 's mongoose, which ejects jewels from its mouth, is said to represent generosity in opposition to greed.

Popular culture
In first seasons of Sailor Moon, and Sailor Moon Crystal, the Four Heavenly Kings were the four loyal and faithfully devoted generals and bodyguards of Prince Endymion.
The third movie of Detective Dee, by Tsui Hark, "Detective Dee: The Four Heavenly Kings" (2018) (traditional Chinese: 狄仁傑之四大天王; simplified Chinese: 狄仁杰之四大天王).
In Pokémon, the group of Pokémon trainers known as the Elite Four in English are called the Four Heavenly Kings (四天王) in Japanese.
In Street Fighter, the leading members of Shadaloo known as the Grand Masters in English are known as the Four Heavenly Kings (四天王). They consist of M. Bison (Vega in Japanese), Vega (Balrog in Japanese), Balrog (M. Bison in Japanese), Sagat (formerly), and F.A.N.G.

See also

Anemoi
Bacab
Four Dwarves (Norse mythology)
Four Holy Beasts
Four Living Creatures
Four sons of Horus
Four Stags (Norse mythology)
Four Symbols
Four temperaments
Guardians of the directions
Lokapala
Royal stars
Svetovid
Tetramorph
Watchtower

References

 Chaudhuri, Saroj Kumar. Hindu Gods and Goddesses in Japan. New Delhi: Vedams eBooks (P) Ltd., 2003. .
 Nakamura, Hajime. Japan and Indian Asia: Their Cultural Relations in the Past and Present. Calcutta: Firma K.L. Mukhopadhyay, 1961. Pp. 1–31.
 Potter, Karl H., ed. The Encyclopedia of Indian Philosophies, volume 9. Delhi: Motilal Banarsidass, 1970–. ,  (set).
 Thakur, Upendra. India and Japan: A Study in Interaction During 5th cent.–14th cent. A.D.. New Delhi: Abhinav Publications, 1992. . Pp. 27–41.

External links 

 Schumacher, Mark. "Shitenno - Four Heavenly Kings (Deva) of Buddhism, Guarding Four Cardinal Directions". Digital Dictionary of Buddhism in Japan.

 
 
Buddhist cosmology
Journey to the West characters
 
Quartets
Buddhist deities
Dharmapalas